A slave is an individual held in forced servitude.

Slave or slaves may also refer to:

Arts, entertainment, and media

Fictional entities
 Slave I, a Star Wars spacecraft
 Slave (Blake's 7), a fictional computer in Blake's 7

Films
 Slave, a 2009 film starring Natassia Malthe
 Slaves (film), a 1969 drama film
 The Slave (1917 comedy film), a 1917 film starring Oliver Hardy
 The Slave (1917 drama film), a 1917 Fox film starring Valeska Suratt
 The Slave (1918 film), a British silent crime film
 The Slave (1953 film), a French-Italian drama film
 The Slave (1962 film), a 1962 film starring Steve Reeves
 My Darling Slave or The Slave, a 1973 sex comedy film

Literature
 Slave - My True Story, a 2002 autobiography by Mende Nazer
 The Slave (Singer novel), a novel by Isaac Bashevis Singer
 The Slave (Hichens novel), an 1899 novel by Robert Hichens
 The Slave, a 1978 novel by Elechi Amadi
 "The Slave" or "Lu Scavu", a fairy tale from Sicily, Italy

Music

Artists
 Slave (band), an Ohio funk band
 Slaves (American band), a Sacramento, California-based rock band, now known as Rain City Drive
 Soft Play, a British punk band formerly known as Slaves

Albums
 Slave (Amen album), 1994
 Slave (Slave album), 1977
Slave, by Lucky Dube, 1987

Songs
 "Slave" (François Feldman song), 1987
 "Slave" (James Reyne song), 1991
 "Slave" (Rolling Stones song), 1981
 "Slave", a song by Bleeding Through from Love Will Kill All
 "Slave", a song by Elton John from Honky Château
 "Slave", a song by Leprous from The Congregation 
 "Slave", a song by Logic from Bobby Tarantino
 "Slave", a song by Paradise Lost from One Second 
 "Slave", a song by Pepper from Pink Crustaceans and Good Vibrations
 "Slave", a song by Prince from Emancipation
 "Slave", a song by Silverchair from Freak Show
 "Slave", a song by Soulfly from Enslaved
 "Slave", a song by Weezer from Maladroit
 "Slaves", a song by Bad Religion from 80–85
 "Slaves", a song by Wolves at the Gate from Captors (album)

Theater
 The Slave (Petipa/Pugni), a ballet
 The Slaves (play), a play by Mohammed ben Abdallah
SLĀV, a controversial 2018 Canadian theatre production

Places
 Slave Craton, a geological formation in the Canadian Shield
 Slave River, a Canadian river

Technology
 Slave (technology), part of master/slave model of communication where one device has control over another

Other uses
 Slave (BDSM), a form of consensual sexual submission

See also
 Forced labour under German rule during World War II
 Ibadah, a servant or worshipper (in Islam)
 Lo schiavo (The Slave), a 1889 opera by Carlos Gomes
 Slav (disambiguation)
 Slaver (disambiguation)
 Slavey language, an Athabaskan language
 Slavey people